Grolier was an American publisher, now an imprint of Scholastic.

Grolier may also refer to:

Jean Grolier de Servières, viscount d'Aguisy (1479–1565), Treasurer-General of France and a bibliophile
Grolier Club, a private club and society of bibliophiles in New York City, United States
Grolier Poetry Bookshop, Cambridge, Massachusetts, United States
Old Grolier Clubo or 29 East 32nd Street, a building in New York City, United States
Grolier Codex, a pre-Columbian Maya book of disputed authenticity